Extreme metal is a loosely defined umbrella term for a number of related heavy metal music subgenres that have developed since the early 1980s. It has been defined as a "cluster of metal subgenres characterized by sonic, verbal, and visual transgression".

The term usually refers to a more abrasive, harsher, underground, non-commercialized style associated with the speed metal, thrash metal, black metal, death metal, and doom metal genres. Hardcore punk has been considered an integral part of the development of extreme metal in song structure and speed, apart from the case of doom metal.

Definitions 
Extreme metal acts set themselves apart from traditional heavy metal acts, such as Iron Maiden, Judas Priest and Motörhead, by incorporating more abrasive musical characteristics such as higher tempos, increased aggression and a harsher extremity. In the majority of the world, extreme metal does not receive much radio-play or achieve high chart positions.

Extreme metal's sonic excess is characterized by high levels of distortion (also in the vocals – growling, gargling or screaming), less focus on guitar solos and melody, emphasis on technical control, and fast tempos (at times, more than 200 beats per minute). Its thematic transgression can be found in more overt and/or serious references to Satanism and the darker aspects of human existence that are considered out of bounds or distasteful, such as death, suicide and war."  "Visual transgression [can include] ... medieval weaponry [and] bloody/horrific artwork."

According to ethnographer Keith Kahn-Harris, the defining characteristics of extreme metal can all be regarded as clearly transgressive: the "extreme" traits noted above are all intended to violate or transgress given cultural, artistic, social or aesthetic boundaries. Kahn-Harris states that extreme metal can be "close to being ... formless noise", at least to the uninitiated listener. He states that with extreme metal lyrics, they often "offer no possibility of hope or redemption" and lyrics often reference apocalyptic themes. Extreme metal lyrics often describe Christianity as weak or submissive, and many songs express misanthropic views such as "kill every thing". A small number of extreme metal bands and song lyrics take radical (left or right) political stances; for example, the Swedish black metal band Marduk has commonly referenced the Nazi Panzer tanks, which can be seen in works such as Panzer Division Marduk (1999).

History

The British band Venom are one of the first bands to venture into extreme metal territory, due to their ideological shift into themes of evil, the devil and hell. Their first two albums, Welcome to Hell (1981) and Black Metal (1982), are considered a major influence on thrash metal and extreme metal in general. This early work by Venom, in combination with bands like Discharge, the Exploited and Amebix as well as American hardcore punk brought integral elements into the budding extreme metal landscape at the time.
In 1983, Metallica would release their debut album Kill 'Em All, which fused elements of the new wave of British heavy metal with hardcore punk and the style of Motörhead, becoming the first thrash metal album, and would eventually be certified triple platinum. A few months later, Slayer would release their own thrash metal album Show No Mercy, influenced by the sounds of Venom, Judas Priest, Iron Maiden, and Mercyful Fate.

When extreme metal band Hellhammer first began making music, it was generally panned by critics, leading to the members forming Celtic Frost in its place, which proved very influential on the progression of the genre. During this period, the line between extreme metal genres were blurred, as thrash metal bands such as Slayer, Sepultura, Sodom, Destruction and Kreator were integral to the first wave black metal scene. The front cover of the Sarcófago's 1987 debut album, I.N.R.I., is regarded as a great influence on black metal's corpse paint style make-up. That record is also considered one of the first wave black metal albums that helped shape the genre. Their second album, The Laws of Scourge, was one of the first technical death metal records to be released.

List of genres

Primary genres 
 Black metal
 Death metal
 Doom metal
 Speed metal
 Thrash metal

Subgenres of primary genres 
 Subgenres of black metal
 Ambient black metal
 Folk black metal
 Industrial black metal
National Socialist black metal
 Post-black metal
 Blackgaze
 Psychedelic black metal
 Raw black metal
 Symphonic black metal
Unblack metal
 Subgenres of death metal
 Brutal death metal
 Industrial death metal
 Melodic death metal
 Old school death metal
 Slam death metal
 Symphonic death metal
 Technical death metal
 Subgenres of doom metal
 Epic doom
 Traditional doom

Fusion genres

Fusions between primary genres 
 Black-doom
 Depressive suicidal black metal
 Blackened death-doom
 Blackened death metal 
 Melodic black-death
 War metal
 Blackened thrash metal
 Death-doom
 Funeral doom
 Deathrash

Fusions with punk rock styles 
 Crossover thrash
 Crust punk
 Blackened crust
 Red and Anarchist black metal
 Crustcore
 Crack rock steady
 Grindcore
 Blackened grindcore
 Deathgrind  
 Electrogrind
 Goregrind
 Noisegrind
 Pornogrind 
 Metalcore
 Deathcore
 Easycore  
 Electronicore
 Mathcore
 Melodic metalcore
 Nu metalcore
 Progressive metalcore
 Sludge metal
 Sludgecore

Fusion with other rock styles 
 Black 'n' roll
 Death 'n' roll
 Gothic-doom 
 Progressive doom
 Stoner metal
 Desert rock

Fusions with other musical styles 
 Drone metal
 Pagan metal 
 Viking metal

Derivatives 
Genres influenced by extreme metal but usually not considered extreme themselves:
 Avant-garde metal
 Beatdown hardcore, influenced by thrash metal;
 Dungeon synth, influenced by black metal;
 Funk metal, influenced by thrash metal;
 Gothic metal, influenced by death-doom and doom metal; 
 Groove metal, influenced by thrash metal and death metal;
 Grunge, influenced by sludge metal and thrash metal;
 Neoclassical metal, influenced by speed metal and thrash metal;
 Nu metal, influenced by thrash metal;
 Post-metal, influenced by doom metal and later by black metal;
 Power metal, influenced by speed metal and thrash metal;
 Sass, influenced by grindcore and metalcore.

References

Notes

Further reading 
 

 
Heavy metal genres
Musical subcultures
Underground culture